Alan (also Romanized as Ālān) is a village in Alan Baraghush Rural District of Mehraban District, Sarab County, East Azerbaijan province, Iran. At the 2006 National Census, its population was 2,373 in 533 households. The following census in 2011 counted 2,203 people in 589 households. The latest census in 2016 showed a population of 1,759 people in 494 households; it was the largest village in its rural district. The village is on the Aji Chay River.

References 

Sarab County

Populated places in East Azerbaijan Province

Populated places in Sarab County